Patito Feo (in English, Ugly Small Duck) is an Argentine telenovela produced by Ideas del Sur that aired on Disney Channel between July 2007 and March 2011 in Latin America, Europe and Asia. Patito Feo originally debuted in early April 2007 on Canal 13, but after the success in Argentina, Disney Channel bought the broadcast rights and began broadcasting the TV show internationally becoming a global phenomenon.

Patito Feo is set in the Pretty Land School of Arts, a prestigious private music school on the outskirts of Buenos Aires, with a major plot line revolving around two teen girl groups –  Las Populares, led by Patito Castro (Laura Esquivel) and Las Divinas, led by Antonella Lamas Bernardi (Brenda Asnicar) – who will compete to win the talent show and sign a record label.

Plot
Patricia (Laura Esquivel ), kindly known as Patito, has to left her humble life in Bariloche with her mother, Carmen (Griselda Siciliani), to move to the big city of Buenos Aires. For health reasons, both travel so Patito can receive the medical treatment that she needs. To Carmen's surprise, the doctor of the hospital will be her unforgettable old love, Leandro (Juan Darthés), the unknown father that Patito has been waiting to find for years.

Due to her passion for music, Patito joins the Pretty Land School of Arts, where she will meet Antonella (Brenda Asnicar), the queen bee of the prestigious private school. Antonella is the daughter of Blanca (Gloria Carrá), who is engaged to Leandro for financial reasons. Antonella is unaware that her family is made up of a group of swindlers, which is why her presumed deceased father is actually in prison in Spain.

Patito and Antonella will become best frenemies. Despite their differences, both share the same dreams: reunite with their respective fathers and became music stars. Two decisive groups will be formed at the Pretty Land School of Arts: Las Divinas, led by Antonella, and Las Populares, led by Patito, who will compete to win the talent show and sign a record label.

Cast

Main characters
Laura Esquivel as Patricia "Patito" Díaz-Rivarola Castro
Brenda Asnicar as Antonella Lamas Bernardi
Juan Darthés as Leandro Díaz Rivarola
Griselda Siciliani as Carmen Castro
Gloria Carrá as Blanca Bernardi

Las Populares 
Thelma Fardin as Josefina Beltrán
Eva De Dominici as Tamara Valiente
María Sol Berecoechea as Sol Démini
Gastón Soffritti as Matías Beltrán
Juan Manuel Guilera as Gonzalo Molina
Rodrigo Velilla as Felipe Sánchez
Nicolás Zuviria as Alan Luna
Nicolás Torcanowsky as Santiago Peep

Las Divinas 
Camila Outon as Pía Zanetti
Camila Salazar as Caterina Artina
Nicole Luis as Luciana Menditegüi
Andrés Gil as Bruno Molina
Santiago Talledo as Guido Leinez
Brian Vainberg as Facundo Lamas Bernardi

Background
With a huge marketing push, the show started its run in April 2007 in Canal 13. In September of that year, the show started airing in the entire Spanish-speaking Latin America market on the Disney Channel and soon, the program became a sensation among kids and teens in the entire continent.

When it debuted, Patito Feo performed exceptionally not only on TV but also on merchandising sales. The soundtrack album was the best-selling album of 2008 in the country and over 100 licensed products were released. An official magazine exceeded sales expectations and had its initial print sold out within a week and a stamp album also had record sales for Panini in Argentina. The song Las Divinas was the best-selling ringtone ever in the country.

In Argentina, 400.000 tickets were sold for the first national live tour, over 150.000 in Buenos Aires and 90.000 in the litoral city of Mar Del Plata during the summer. Afterwards, the complete cast toured Latin America with over 700.000 tickets sold for shows in Mexico, Chile, Colombia, Peru, Venezuela, Panama, Dominican Republic, Uruguay, Guatemala, Costa Rica, Nicaragua, Ecuador, El Salvador, Bolivia and Paraguay.

In 2008, Patito Feo won the Martin Fierro Award and received a nomination for the International Emmy Award for Best Children & Young Adults program.

The show became a huge success soon after its debut. The soundtrack was the best-selling album of 2007 according to CAPIF, over 70 licensed products were released and the cast toured Argentina (with stops in Buenos Aires, where over 160,000 people saw the live concert, Mendoza, Córdoba, Mar del Plata, Rosario, Salta, Tucuman and Santa Fe) and, subsequently, the rest of South America, North America and Central America with stops in Mexico, Chile, Uruguay, Panama, Dominican Republic, Peru, Colombia, Venezuela, Guatemala, Costa Rica, Nicaragua, Ecuador, El Salvador, Bolivia and Turkey, selling out arenas and stadiums.

In 2008, Patito Feo won the Martin Fierro Award and received a nomination for the International Emmy Award for Best Children & Young Adults program.

Although the show was incredibly well received by the audience, Patito Feo attracted huge criticism due to the fact it glamorized the villains, a group of mean and beautiful girls that called themselves Las Divinas (The Divines). Besides being superficial, Las Divinas were also mean and bullied Patito. The fact the villains were much more popular among young girls than the main character caused concern over some groups and the issue was even on the cover Noticias, Argentina's most important current affairs magazine, under the headline "The Triumph of Discrimination".

In early 2008, under the name De Tout Mon Coeur, Patito Feo started airing on children channel Gulli in France. It soon became a huge success, being the most-watched show on the channel. A few months later, Elastic Rights bought the rights to distribute the show in Italy, Portugal and Spain.

In Italy, Il Mondo di Patty and debuted on the Disney Channel and soon became a gigantic hit. Due to the big popularity, a huge merchandising line was unveiled and Laura Esquivel visited the country to promote the show. The rights were bought by terrestrial Mediaset-owned Italia 1 which started airing the show in the Summer of 2009. Il Mondo di Patty became an even bigger success in the country, being one of the most-watched shows on the channel.

Also in 2008, Patito Feo debuted on Cartoon Network in Spain. It was very well received and became one of the top shows among young girls on cable. In 2009, it debuted on the Disney Channel and became one of the highest-rated shows on cable in Spain, topping Hannah Montana.

In Italy and Spain, the show spawned over 200 merchandising including toys, apparel, cosmetics, food items and a video game for PlayStation and a special Singstar game. The soundtrack album was certified over 5× Platinum in both countries. It was also a huge rating hit in Portugal, Greece and Turkey. In Greece, the album was certified for 11× Platinum.

With the success of the show, Laura Esquivel launched a successful Italian acting career in Italy, where she stars in movies and TV shows. Legal problems between the executive producers of the show and the production company made hard for the cast to tour in those countries. However, a new musical with local actors was licensed and, even though none of the original cast members were part of the production (with the exception of Laura Esquivel for a few special presentations), over 250.000 tickets were sold in Italy and Spain. Over 30.000 tickets were sold for concerts in Athens.

Legal problems
In late 2008, Alejandro Stoessel, creator of Patito, was fired. Disagreements between him and the production company started after two shows he was in charge of, the second season of Patito Feo and the teen-oriented show Atraccion x 4, failed to reach expectations and ended up being canceled. After parting ways with the company, he started a lawsuit against Ideas del Sur asking for a part of Patito Feo profits because he claims he was responsible for creating the entire concept. The lawsuit not only was the reason a new leg of a Latin American tour was canceled but also a European tour, where the show was also enjoying huge popularity.

After his dismissal, Alejandro Stoessel was hired by Dori Media to develop a new show targeted to kids and teenagers.

At the same time, Ideas del Sur started to develop a new youth-oriented show, Malcriados (now titled Consentidos), and chose Brenda Asnicar, who had enjoyed high popularity in her role as Antonella, as one of the lead actresses. At the same time, Dori Media and Stoessel wanted her to star in their new show, Ñeka.

Brenda finally decided to do the Dori Media project and, not satisfied with being turned down, Ideas de Sur started a lawsuit against Brenda's management since her contract stipulated she should prioritize Ideas del Sur projects over other production companies.

Finally, Ñeka was renamed Mia, mi Amiga Invisible and will debut at Mipcom in Cannes starring Brenda. But the show is also facing various lawsuits: besides Ideas del Sur, Valeria Britos, the creator of the original script (when it was titled Ñeka), is also suing Dori Media.

The lawsuit prevented the cast, especially Brenda Asnicar, of touring across Europe in 2010 to promote the show.

International release

References

External links
 Official site (in Spanish)
 Fans community
 IMDB

Musical telenovelas
2007 telenovelas
2007 Argentine television series debuts
2008 Argentine television series endings
2000s children's television series
Disney Channel original programming
Argentine telenovelas
Spanish-language telenovelas
Teen telenovelas
Children's telenovelas
El Trece telenovelas
Television series about teenagers

mk:Грдото пајче
nap:Il Mondo Di Patty